The 1985 Player's International Canadian Open was a tennis tournament played on outdoor hard courts. The men's tournament was held at the Jarry Park Stadium in Montreal in Canada and was part of the 1985 Nabisco Grand Prix while the women's tournament was held at the National Tennis Centre in Toronto in Canada and was part of the 1985 Virginia Slims World Championship Series. The men's tournament was held from August 12 through August 18, 1985, while the women's tournament was held from August 19 through August 25, 1985.

Finals

Men's singles

 John McEnroe defeated  Ivan Lendl 7–5, 6–3
 It was McEnroe's 7th singles title of the year and the 66th of his career.

Women's singles

 Chris Evert Lloyd defeated  Claudia Kohde-Kilsch 6–2, 6–4
 It was Evert Lloyd's 7th title of the year and the 143rd of her career, and her 4th Canadian Open title.

Men's doubles

 Ken Flach /  Robert Seguso defeated  Stefan Edberg /  Anders Järryd 7–5, 7–6
 It was Flach's 6th title of the year and the 12th of his career. It was Seguso's 6th title of the year and the 12th of his career.

Women's doubles

 Gigi Fernández /  Martina Navratilova defeated  Marcella Mesker /  Pascale Paradis 6–4, 6–0
 It was Fernández's 3rd title of the year and the 3rd of her career. It was Navratilova's 21st title of the year and the 208th of her career.

See also
 Lendl–McEnroe rivalry

References

External links
 
 Association of Tennis Professionals (ATP) tournament profile
 Women's Tennis Association (WTA) tournament profile

Player's Canadian Open
Player's Canadian Open
Player's Canadian Open
Player's Canadian Open
Canadian Open (tennis)